The Kingdom of Twilight is a 1929 film directed by British author and explorer Alexander MacDonald.

Plot
Jim Carrington leaves England with his daughter Dorothy after a scandal, and seeks his fortune as a gold prospector in northern Australia. He learns of a mysterious tribe of aborigines but is wounded and captured by the drive. He is given up for dead by everyone except for Dorothy who continues to search for him. She is captured by the tribe as well and discovers her father is alive. They return together to white civilisation where Dorothy is reunited with a young gold miner who loves her.

Cast
Wendy Osborne as Dorothy Carrington
John Faulkner as Jim Carrington
Robert Leslie Shepherd
Rex Arnot as McCrimmon
David Wallace as Reginald Carewe
Len Norman as Tanami
Laurel Macdonald as baby
Herrick Corbett as Puggy Markham
Jean Seton

Production
MacDonald had previously made a film called The Unsleeping Eye (1928) in Papua, which was a commercial success. He reused many cast and crew on this film, including his wife, actor Wendy Osborne.

Scenes were shot at an old mining camp in Chillagoe with an aboriginal corroboree staged in the Mungana Caves nearby. Shooting was finished by September 1928.

Release
The film was released in England but not Australia, although it did have some screenings in 1932.

References

External links
The Kingdome of Twilight in the Internet Movie Database
The Kingdom of Twilight at National Film and Sound Archive

1929 films
Lost Australian films
Australian black-and-white films